This is a list of football games played by the Uzbekistan national football team between 2010 and 2019.

2010

2011

2012

2013

2014

2015

2016

2017

2018

2019

See also
 Uzbekistan national football team
 Uzbekistan national football team results (1992–99)
 Uzbekistan national football team results (2000–09)
 Uzbekistan national football team results – B Matches

References

External links

2010s in Uzbekistani sport
2010